Otto Olavus Johannessen (25 July 1894 - 6 December 1962) was a Norwegian gymnast who competed in the 1920 Summer Olympics.

He was part of the Norwegian team which won the silver medal in the gymnastics men's team, free system event. His affiliation was with Bergens TF. He died in New York City.

References

1894 births
1962 deaths
Norwegian male artistic gymnasts
Gymnasts at the 1920 Summer Olympics
Olympic gymnasts of Norway
Olympic silver medalists for Norway
Norwegian expatriates in the United States
Olympic medalists in gymnastics
Medalists at the 1920 Summer Olympics
20th-century Norwegian people